Eucalyptus victrix, commonly known as the smooth-barked coolibah, western coolibah or little ghost gum, is a species of small tree that is endemic to Australia. It has smooth bark, lance-shaped to curved adult leaves, flower buds in groups of seven, creamy white flowers and conical fruit.

Description
Flowering occurs between November and March and the flowers are creamy white.

Taxonomy and naming
Eucalyptus victrix was first formally described in 1994 by Lawrie Johnson and Ken Hill in the journal Telopea from specimens collected near the Tea Tree Well roadhouse near the Stuart Highway in the Northern Territory. The specific epithet (victrix) is the feminine form of the Latin word victor, referring to this species' success in a harsh climate.

Distribution
The smooth-barked coolibah is found on flats and flood plains in the Mid West, Pilbara, Kimberley and north eastern Goldfields-Esperance regions of Western Australia where it grows in sandy-loamy or clay-sand soils. It is also found through much of the Northern Territory and in far western Queensland.

Uses

Traditional uses
Indigenous Australians traditionally used the tree for many purposes including as a food and water source, weapons, implements, firewood, shade, shelter and for cultural purposes. The Arrente peoples know the tree as ankerre, the Jaru as gurndad and the Pitjantjatjara as ankara.

Use in horticulture
This eucalypt is not commonly cultivated but it suitable as a garden ornamental plant which tolerates full sun and is suited to most soil types that are free-draining. It does not usually require pruning except to shape and form. It can be grown from seed and is tolerant to most diseases and pests. The tree is drought and wind tolerant.

See also
List of Eucalyptus species

References

Eucalypts of Western Australia
Flora of the Northern Territory
Flora of Queensland
Trees of Australia
victrix
Myrtales of Australia
Plants described in 1994
Taxa named by Lawrence Alexander Sidney Johnson
Taxa named by Ken Hill (botanist)